The Federalist Christian Democracy-Convention of Federalists for Christian Democracy is a political party in the Democratic Republic of the Congo.

Pierre Pay-Pay wa Syakasighe, the party's presidential candidate in the 2006 general election came seventh with 1.5% of the vote, and the party gained 8 seats in the National Assembly.
On 19 January 2007 Senate elections, the party won out 1 of 108 seats.

Christian democratic parties in Africa
Federalism in the Democratic Republic of the Congo
Federalist parties
Political parties in the Democratic Republic of the Congo
Political parties with year of establishment missing